Ivan Bochev is a Bulgarian artist, arts teacher and scholar from Veliko Tarnovo, Bulgaria.

Youth and early life 
Bochev was born in his family's farm in the village of Draganovo, situated 25 km North of Veliko Turnovo on 12 October 1946. He finished the local school and applied to the Veliko Tarnovo University.  He was admitted with a scholarship, scoring high marks on the exams without having taken any special classes prior.

In 1975 Bochev graduated graphic art at the Veliko Tarnovo University's faculty of Fine arts with distinction. A few years later he was invited to teach art, and after winning a competition, he was appointed as a full-time lecturer.

Academic career 
In 1991 Bochev, became an associate professor at the Veliko Tarnovo University. Later he became dean of the arts department and was the first one in the University's history to be re-elected for the position three times in a row.

Awards 
List of notable awards:

 2012 – International Bianale Varna, Bulgaria
 2007 – Annual award of the mayor “Veliko Tarnovo”
 1988 – Montana, OHI
 1985 – Montana, “A look through the ages” plenum
 1984 – Varna, 3rd place at national competition

List of solo exhibitions 
 2009 - Istanbul, Turkey
 2005 – Sevlievo, Bulgaria;
 1998 – Gallery “Spectur, V. Turnovo, Bulgaria;
 1996 – Deutsches Theater , Goettingen,  Germany;
 1996 – Bohemico Gallery Hanover, Germany;
 1995 – Town Library, Schwerte, Germany
 1994 – National exhibitions in Autumn, Plovdiv, Bulgaria;
 1994 – Senator’s Library, Brazil;
 1994 – Monica Elizabeth Gallery, Hemer, Germany;
 1986 – V. Turnovo, Bulgaria;
 1986 – St. Zagora, Bulgaria;
 1984 – Varna,
 1978 – Cracow, Poland

References

External links 

Prof. Ivan Bochev, PhD in Drawing - Alfa Art
Artist Review by Ivan Botchev

1946 births
Living people